Edward Luton Tunney (23 September 1915 – 8 September 2011) was an English footballer who played as a full back.

Pre-war career
Tunney started his career in football on the staff at Everton, however whilst there he would play in the reserve side.

He would then move to Wrexham in 1937, staying there until he was forced to move away due to his stationing as a sergeant instructor.

During the war
During the war, Tunney would play as a war-time guest for Tranmere Rovers, Hartlepool United, Crystal Palace and Tottenham Hotspur

Post-war career
After the war, Tunney would return to Wrexham, where he played until 1952. He made a total of 222 appearances for Wrexham over the course of his two spells there, before moving to non-league Winsford United.

Death
Tunney would die on 8 September 2011, just a few weeks away from his 96th birthday. He is survived by his wife, Daisy.

References

1915 births
2011 deaths
English footballers
Association football defenders
English Football League players
Everton F.C. players
Wrexham A.F.C. players
Winsford United F.C. players